Labeo cyclopinnis is fish in genus Labeo. It is only known from the rapids of the Middle Congo River and the Ubangi river in Africa.

References 

 

cyclopinnis
Cyprinid fish of Africa
Fish described in 1917